Maria Àngels Anglada was a Catalan poet and novelist. She was born in Vic, Spain, in 1920. She received a degree in Classical Philology at the University of Barcelona.  Her first novel, Les closes, won the Josep Pla Award. Her 1985 novel Sandàlies d'escuma (Sandals of Foam) won the Lletra d'Or Prize. She died in 1999.

Bibliography
Díptic (1972), poetry (with Núria Albó)
Les closes (1979), novel
Kyapartssia (1980)
No em dic Laura (1981), short stories
Viola d'amore (1983), novel
Columnes d'hores (1990), poetry
The Violin of Auschwitz (1994), novel
Sandàlies d'escuma (1985), novel
Quadern d'Aram (1997), novel

References

External links
 Associació d'Escriptors en Llengua Catalana (accessed 09-2010) - English-language page about Anglada at The Catalan Language Writers' Association
 Maria Àngels Anglada at LletrA, Catalan Literature Online (Open University of Catalonia) (English)

Catalan-language writers
Poets from Catalonia
Novelists from Catalonia
Short story writers from Catalonia
Literary critics from Catalonia
Spanish women literary critics
1930 births
1999 deaths
Spanish women poets
20th-century Spanish women writers
20th-century Spanish novelists
20th-century Spanish poets
Spanish women short story writers
Women writers from Catalonia
20th-century short story writers
University of Barcelona alumni